Wik is a 2016 Peruvian thriller drama film directed by Rodrigo Moreno del Valle (in his directorial debut) and written by del Valle & llary Alencastre Pinilla.

Synopsis 
Three young people live the summer of a city that seems to be static. In their eagerness to "do something with their time" they find themselves in a situation that makes them know more about themselves and the worlds they inhabit.

Cast 

 JeanPhil Arrieta
 Pedro Pablo Corpancho
 Piera Del Campo
 Olivia Manrufo
 Norma Martinez

Production 
Much of the film was recorded in Lince, they started in April 2014 and filmed one week of each month. In total, the shoot lasted 18 days in 3 to 4 months.

Release 
The film had its world premiere at BAFICI in April 2016. A year later, the film had its commercial premiere in Peruvian theaters on April 20, 2017.

Reception 
Wik in its first and only week on the billboards it attracted 611 viewers to the theater.

References

External links 

 

2016 films
2016 thriller drama films
Peruvian thriller drama films
2010s Peruvian films
2010s Spanish-language films
Films set in Peru
Films shot in Peru
Films about friendship
2016 directorial debut films